"Candy Everybody Wants" is the second single by alternative rock group 10,000 Maniacs from their 1992 album, Our Time in Eden. The song was written by Dennis Drew and Natalie Merchant, the band's keyboardist and lead singer respectively. Rolling Stone wrote that the song is about "the American appetite for televised sex and violence – and big business's willingness to satisfy that craving."

Charts

References

1992 songs
1993 singles
10,000 Maniacs songs
Elektra Records singles
Songs written by Dennis Drew
Songs written by Natalie Merchant